The 1950 Big Ten Conference football season was the 55th season of college football played by the member schools of the Big Ten Conference and was a part of the 1950 college football season.

The 1950 Michigan Wolverines football team, under head coach Bennie Oosterbaan, won the 1950 Big Ten championship with a 6–3–1 record (4–1–1 against Big Ten opponents) and was ranked No. 9 in the final AP Poll. In the last game of the regular season, Michigan defeated Ohio State, 9–3, in the Snow Bowl, played in a blizzard, at 10 degrees above zero, on an icy field, and with winds gusting over 30 miles per hour. Michigan then defeated California in the 1951 Rose Bowl. Don Dufek was selected as the team's most valuable player. Tackle Allen Wahl was a first-team All-American.

The 1950 Ohio State Buckeyes football team, under head coach Wes Fesler, compiled a 6–3 record, led the conference in scoring offense (31.8 points per game), and was ranked No. 14 in the final AP Poll. Halfback Vic Janowicz was a consensus first-team All-American and won both the Chicago Tribune Silver Football trophy as the Big Ten's most valuable player and the Heisman Trophy as the best player in college football.

The 1950 Illinois Fighting Illini football team, under head coach Ray Eliot, compiled a 7–2 record, led the conference in scoring defense (6.2 points allowed per game), and was ranked No. 13 in the final AP Poll.  End Tony Klimek was selected as the team's most valuable player. Tackle Albert Tate and center Bill Vohaska both received first-team All-American honors.

Season overview

Results and team statistics

Key
AP final = Team's rank in the final AP Poll of the 1950 season
AP high = Team's highest rank in the AP Poll throughout the 1950 season
PPG = Average of points scored per game
PAG = Average of points allowed per game
MVP = Most valuable player as voted by players on each team as part of the voting process to determine the winner of the Chicago Tribune Silver Football trophy; trophy winner in bold

Regular season

September 30
On September 30, 1950, the Big Ten football teams played nine-conference games, resulting in four wins, four losses, and one tie.

 Michigan State 14, Michigan 7

 SMU 32, Ohio State 27.

 Wisconsin 28, Marquette 6.

 Illinois 28, Ohio 2.

 Northwestern 23, Iowa State 13.

 Iowa 20, USC 14.

 Washington 28, Minnesota 13.

 Indiana 20, Nebraska 20.

 Texas 34, Purdue 26.

October 7
On October 7, 1950, the Big Ten played two conference games and five non-conference games. The non-conference games resulted in four wins and a loss, bringing the Big Nine's non-conference record to 8-5-1.

 Michigan 27, Dartmouth 7.

 Ohio State 41, Pittsburgh 7.

 Wisconsin 7, Illinois 6.

 Northwestern 22, Navy 0.

 Indiana 20, Iowa 7.

 Nebraska 32, Minnesota 26.

 Purdue 28, Notre Dame 14.

October 14
On October 13 and 14, 1950, the Big Ten played three conference games and three non-conference games.  The non-conference games resulted in one win and two losses, bringing the Big Nine's non-conference record to 9-7-1.

 Illinois 14, UCLA 6. (Friday, October 13)

 Army 27, Michigan 6.

 Ohio State 26, Indiana 14.

 Wisconsin 14, Iowa 0.

 Northwestern 13, Minnesota 6.

 Miami (FL) 20, Purdue 14.

October 21
On October 21, 1950, the Big Ten played three conference games and three non-conference games.  The non-conference games resulted in three wins, bringing the Big Nine's non-conference record to 12-7-1.

 Michigan 26, Wisconsin 13.

 Ohio State 48, Minnesota 0.

 Illinois 20, Washington 13.

 Northwestern 28, Pittsburgh 23.

 Iowa 33, Purdue 21.

 Indiana 20, Notre Dame 7.

October 28
On October 28, 1950, the Big Ten played four conference games and one non-conference game. The non-conference game was a loss, bringing the Big Nine's non-conference record to 12-8-1.

 Michigan 7, Minnesota 7.

 Ohio State 83, Iowa 21.

 Wisconsin 14, Northwestern 13.

 Illinois 20, Indiana 0.

 UCLA 20, Purdue 6.

November 4
On November 4, 1950, the Big Ten played four conference games and one non-conference game. The non-conference game was a loss, bringing the Big Nine's non-conference record to 12-9-1.

 Illinois 7, Michigan 0'''.

 Ohio State 32, Northwestern 0.

 Wisconsin 33, Purdue 7.

 Iowa 13, Minnesota 0.

 Michigan State 35, Indiana 0.

November 11
On November 11, 1950, the Big Ten played four conference games and one non-conference game. The non-conference game was a loss, bringing the Big Nine's non-conference record to 12-10-1.

 Michigan 20, Indiana 7.

 Ohio State 19, Wisconsin 14.

 Illinois 21, Iowa 7.

 Northwestern 19, Purdue 14.

 Michigan State 27, Minnesota 0.

November 18
On November 18, 1950, the Big Ten played three conference games and three non-conference games. The non-conferences game resulted in two wins and a loss, bringing the Big Nine's non-conference record to 14-11-1.

 Michigan 34, Northwestern 23.

 Illinois 14, Ohio State 7.

 Penn 20, Wisconsin 0.

 Iowa 14, Notre Dame 14.

 Minnesota 27, Purdue 14.

 Indiana 18, Marquette 7.

November 25
On November 25, 1950, the Big Ten played four conference games and one non-conference game. The non-conference game was a loss, bringing the Big Nine's non-conference record to 14-12-1. Three of the non-conference losses were to Michigan State.

 Miami (FL) 14, Iowa 6. (Friday, November 24)

 Michigan 9, Ohio State 3.

 Wisconsin 14, Minnesota 0.

 Northwestern 14, Illinois 7.

 Purdue 13, Indiana 0.

Bowl games

 Michigan 14, California 6''. On January 1, 1951, Michigan defeated California, 14–6, in the 1951 Rose Bowl. California scored on a 39-yard touchdown pass in the second quarter and led, 6-0, at the start of the fourth quarter. Michigan fullback Don Dufek, Sr. scored two rushing touchdowns in the fourth quarter and Harry Allis kicked both extra points. Dufek had 23 carries for 113 rushing yards, and Michigan halfback Chuck Ortmann completed 15 of 19 passes for 146 yards. Ortmann and Dufek were both seniors appearing in their final game for Michigan. Dufek was named the game's most valuable player. The game was the fifth consecutive victory for the Big Nine over the Pacific Coast Conference in Rose Bowl games.

All-conference players

The following players were picked by the Associated Press (AP) and/or the United Press (UP) as first-team players on the 1950 All-Big Ten Conference football team.

All-Americans

At the end of the 1950 season, Big Ten players secured only one of the consensus first-team picks for the 1950 College Football All-America Team. The Big Ten's consensus All-American was:

Other Big Ten players who were named first-team All-Americans by at least one selector were:

1951 NFL Draft
The following Big Ten players were among the first 100 picks in the 1951 NFL Draft:

References